Galaxy Minstrels are milk chocolate buttons with a hard glazed shell sold in several countries including the UK, Republic of Ireland, South Africa, Kenya, Cyprus, Malta, Canada and Spain.

They originally had the slogan "They melt in your mouth, not in your hands", featuring in 1980s British advertisements, the same slogan used in the UK for Treets in the 1960s, and for M&M's in the UK and US up to the 1990s.

In line with Mars' re-branding, Minstrels were brought under the Galaxy brand and are now sold as "Galaxy Minstrels", referring to the use of Galaxy chocolate in them.

"Sophisticated sharing" and Croker & Jory
 
A new British advertising campaign in July 2008 was accompanied by a new slogan: "Sophisticated sharing".  One of their advertisements featured two women, consuming Minstrels, ostensibly in an  upmarket theatre, commenting knowledgeably on their seats and the theatre acoustics, only to be revealed as delighted viewers of a male strip act.

See also 
 Treets another Mars-owned brand of sugar-shelled confectionery that pre-dated Minstrels
 Smarties, a similar brand of chocolate sweets in sugar shells with different colours 
 M&M's, a Mars owned brand of sugar-shelled chocolates
 Revels, a Mars-owned brand of chocolate that includes Minstrels

References

British confectionery
Mars confectionery brands